The Just City is a science fiction/fantasy novel by Jo Walton, published by Tor Books in January 2015. It is the first book of the Thessaly trilogy. The sequel The Philosopher Kings was published in June 2015, and the final volume, Necessity, in July 2016.

Synopsis
The Greek gods Athene and Apollo collect 10,000 human children from throughout history, and place them on the island of Thera prior to its volcanic destruction. There, a collection of adult supervisors (who are likewise from throughout history) will raise the children to achieve the ideal society as described in Plato's Republic – which becomes much more difficult when Socrates arrives.

Characters
The characters include:
 Apollo, god of knowledge through intuition.
 Maia, Young woman from the Victorian era.
 Simmea, an Egyptian girl brought to the Just City as a child.
 Athene, goddess of knowledge through study.
 Adeimantus, Benjamin Jowett, British translator of Plato.
 Aristomache, Ellen Francis Mason, American translator of Plato.
 Atticus, Titus Pomponius Atticus, Roman friend of Cicero.
 Marsilio Ficino, Florentine Neoplatonist.
 Ikaros, Giovanni Pico della Mirandola, Italian philosopher.
 Krito, Socrates' friend.
 Lukretia, Lucrezia Borgia, Italian aristocrat.
 Anicius Manlius Severinus Boethius, Roman philosopher.
 Plotinus, Roman philosopher.
 Sokrates, Athenian philosopher.
 Marcus Tullius Cicero, Roman politician.

Reception
At NPR, Amal El-Mohtar called City "(b)rilliant, compelling, and frankly unputdownable", comparing it to a Socratic dialogue, while at Booklist, Michael Cart described it as a "remarkable novel of ideas", conceding that it may be somewhat "abstruse", but emphasizing that this does not detract from the quality of its plot and characterization.

Publishers Weekly stated that City was "impressively ambitious", but criticized Walton for overuse of sexual violence and for a "reductive" portrayal of the Greek gods. Similarly, Kirkus Reviews considered the protagonists to "have a certain appeal", but stated that the novel was "more thought experiment than plot".

The Spanish-language translation, La ciudad justa, was a finalist for the 2022 Premio Ignotus.

References

2015 fantasy novels
Classical mythology in popular culture
Cultural depictions of Socrates
Novels by Jo Walton
Welsh fantasy novels
Canadian fantasy novels
2015 British novels
2015 Canadian novels
Tor Books books